Frontodexia is a genus of bristle flies in the family Tachinidae.

Distribution
Madagascar

Species
Frontodexia lutea Mesnil, 1976

References

Dexiinae
Diptera of Africa
Tachinidae genera
Monotypic Brachycera genera